Sailfin may refer to:

 Sailfin molly, a species of fish, Poecilia latipinna. 
 SailFin, SIP application server.
 Sailfin moonfishes.